The 354th Fighter Squadron (354 FS) is part of the 355th Fighter Wing at Davis–Monthan Air Force Base, Arizona.  It operates A-10 Thunderbolt II aircraft conducting close air support missions.

The squadron conducts Close Air Support, Air Interdiction, Forward Air Control – Airborne, and Combat Search and rescue for theater commanders worldwide.

History
The 354th flew combat missions in the European Theater of Operations from 14 September 1943 to 25 April 1945 and in Southeast Asia from 13 March to 12 June 1965, 28 November 1965 – 7 October 1970, and c. 14 January–3 July 1973.

It conducted combat crew training from, 1971–1982 and forward air control training since 1991. In February 2015, the squadron was deployed to Spangdahlem Air Base, Germany, in support of Operation Atlantic Resolve. Twelve A-10s and approximately 300 airmen were deployed. The unit will train alongside NATO allies and deploy to locations in Eastern European NATO nations to further enhance interoperability. The A-10s were the first of several theater security package deployments to Europe, U.S. Air Force officials said, adding that rotations generally will last six months, depending on mission and United States European Command requirements.

Lineage
 Constituted as the 354th Fighter Squadron and activated, on 12 November 1942
 Redesignated 354th Fighter Squadron, Single Engine on 21 August 1944
 Inactivated on 20 November 1946
 Redesignated 354th Fighter-Interceptor Squadron on 11 September 1952
 Activated on 1 November 1952
 Inactivated on 8 January 1958
 Redesignated 354th Tactical Fighter Squadron and activated on 13 April 1962 (not organized)
 Organized on 25 April 1962
 Redesignated 354th Tactical Fighter Training Squadron on 1 April 1979
 Inactivated on 30 April 1982
 Redesignated 354th Fighter Squadron and activated on 1 November 1991.

Assignments
 355th Fighter Group: 12 November 1942 – 20 November 1946
 27th Air Division: 1 November 1952
 533d Air Defense Group: 16 February 1953
 355th Fighter Group: 18 August 1955 – 8 January 1958
 Tactical Air Command: 13 April 1962 (not organized)
 831st Air Division: 25 April 1962
355th Tactical Fighter Wing: 8 July 1962
Thirteenth Air Force: 10 December 1970
 4453d Combat Crew Training Wing: 1 April 1971
 355th Tactical Fighter Wing (later 355th Tactical Training Wing): 1 July 1971 – 30 April 1982
 602d Air Control Wing: 1 November 1991
 355th Operations Group: 1 May 1992 – 31 December 2018 
 355th Fighter Wing: 1 January 2019 – Present

Stations
Orlando Army Air Base, Florida, 12 November 1942
Zephyr Hills Army Air Field, Florida< 30 January 1943
Norfolk Municipal Airport, Virginia, 18 February 1943
Philadelphia Municipal Airport, Pennsylvania, 4 March 1943
Millville Army Air Field, New Jersey, 5 May - 16 June 1943
RAF Steeple Morden, England, 6 July 1943
Gablingen, Germany, 17 July 1945
Schweinfurt, Germany, 15 April 1946
Mitchel Field, New York, 1 August – 20 November 1946
Long Beach Municipal Airport, California, 1 November 1952
Oxnard Air Force Base, California, 16 December 1952 (operated From: Moody Air Force Base, Georgia, 8 May – 10 June 1955
McGhee Tyson Airport, Tennessee, 18 August 1955 – 8 January 1958
George Air Force Base, California, 25 April 1962 (operated from Eielson Air Force Base, Alaska 24 January – 14 February 1964, Incirlik Air Base, Turkey 5 May – 18 September 1964)
McConnell Air Force Base, Kansas, 15 October 1964 – 27 November 1965 (deployed to Kadena Air Base, Okinawa, then Korat Royal Thai Air Force Base, Thailand (6 March – 18 June 1965)
Takhli Royal Thai Air Force Base, Thailand, 28 November 1965
Davis–Monthan Air Force Base, Arizona, 15 April 1970 – 30 April 1982 (deployed to Korat Royal Thai Air Force Base, Thailand 14 January – 4 July 1973)
 Davis–Monthan Air Force Base, Arizona, 1 November 1991
 McChord Air Force Base, Washington, 5 January 1993
 Davis–Monthan Air Force Base, Arizona, 1 October 1994 – Present

Aircraft

 Republic P-47 Thunderbolt (1943–1944)
 North American P-51 Mustang (1944–1946, 1952–1953)
 Lockheed F-94C Starfire (1953–1955)
 North American F-86D Sabre (1955–1957)
 Republic F-105 Thunderchief (1962–1970)
 LTV A-7D Corsair II (1971–1979)
 Fairchild Republic A-10 Thunderbolt II (1979–1982, 1991 – Present)

Awards and campaigns

See also

References

Notes

Bibliography

 
 
 
355th Operations Group Fact Sheet

354
Military units and formations in Arizona
Fighter squadrons of the United States Army Air Forces